Óscar René Brayson Vidal (also spelled Braison; born February 10, 1985) is a Cuban judoka. Born in Camagüey, he won the bronze medal at the 2008 Summer Olympics.

References

External links
 
 
 

1985 births
Living people
Judoka at the 2007 Pan American Games
Judoka at the 2008 Summer Olympics
Judoka at the 2011 Pan American Games
Judoka at the 2012 Summer Olympics
Olympic judoka of Cuba
Olympic bronze medalists for Cuba
Olympic medalists in judo
Medalists at the 2008 Summer Olympics
Sportspeople from Camagüey
Cuban male judoka
Pan American Games gold medalists for Cuba
Pan American Games medalists in judo
Central American and Caribbean Games gold medalists for Cuba
Competitors at the 2006 Central American and Caribbean Games
Central American and Caribbean Games medalists in judo
Medalists at the 2011 Pan American Games
20th-century Cuban people
21st-century Cuban people